El Teatro de Danza Contemporanea de El Salvador (TDC), is a contemporary dance company based in Washington, DC, United States.  It is a non-profit institution in residence at  Joy of Motion Dance Center.  Its youth leadership program was formerly based at Centro Nia. It was led in 2007 by Miya Hisaka Silva.

Repertoire
 Esperanza (Hope)
 Retazos de Vida (Fragments of Life)
 Declaracione
 Recordando El Silencio (Remembering the Silence)
 Rincon de mi Alma (Corner of my Spirit)
 Stabat Mater
 Concierto

References

External links

Salvadoran culture
Contemporary dance companies